Lone Pine High School was  established in 1916. The first graduating class of the school was in 1919. The class of 2018 will be the 100th graduating class in Lone Pine High Schools history. It is the only high school in the Census-designated place (CDP) of Lone Pine, California. The school colors are purple and gold, and the mascot is the Golden Eagle.

Athletics 
Lone Pine's school mascot is the golden eagle. Lone Pine offers a variety of varsity sports, including football, volleyball, basketball (boys and girls), skiing and snowboarding, baseball, softball, golf, and track and field. Lone Pine High School has won 30 championships in sports. 9 baseball championships, 3 football championships, 6 basketball championships, 7 softball championships, 5 volleyball championships, the most championships in Inyo County. The football team holds the longest losing streak in California high school football history: from 1975 to 1982 the Lone Pine Golden Eagles football team lost 55 straight games. The school  changed to eight-man football in 1983 when they won their first game vs. Hesperia Christian. The class of 1984 was credited with the changing of the sports programs at the school due to the desire to make a difference.

Student government 
Lone Pine High School offers an opportunity for student government leadership through their ASB (Associated Student Body). The positions include, president, vice president, secretary, treasurer, sports commissioner, and pep rally commissioner. Other offices include class representatives for the freshmen/sophomore/junior/senior classes, and club representatives from any clubs which want representatives. Both commissioner positions are available as double positions, meaning that two students can run as a team in the elections.

ASB elections are usually held in the spring, enabling the government to act for a calendar year as opposed to a school year.

References

External links 

Public high schools in California
Education in Inyo County, California
1916 establishments in California